Islanders is the third studio album by German EDM (Electronic Dance Music) act York. The album was in production for two years and collaborations internationally renowned artists such as Mike Oldfield, Jennifer Paige and The Thrillseekers. Furthermore, the album contains a cover version of the Hans Zimmer Mission: Impossible 2 soundtrack piece "Injection", featuring the original vocalist, Lisa Gerrard.

The following year York worked with Oldfield on an album of reworkings of Oldfield's work, Tubular Beats.

Track listing

External links 
 

2012 albums
York (group) albums
Armada Music albums